Thakin Po Hla Gyi (1909–1943) was a Burmese oil worker and one of the leaders of the Year 1300 Strikes against British colonial rule. The movement began in Magway in 1938 and 1939 and involved around 10,000 workers. In 1938 he wrote the pamphlet, "Thabeik Sit Pwe (The Strike War)" which was republished in 1968, and later translated into English in 2012.

Life
Po Hla Gyi was born between 1908 and 1910. Like other members of the Dobama Asiayon, he took the title Thakin. In 1938, he was part of the contingent of striking miners that marched from Chauk to Rangoon in November to present their demands to the BOC. During the strike, owing to his militancy, he became known as alawaka, or “The Ogre”, He returned to Chauk in June 1939.

He died of stomach cancer at the makeshift Rangoon Public Hospital in January or February 1943.

Legacy
In 1987, his image was inscribed on the 45 kyat banknote. In 2013, a statue was erected in Chauk which is a focal point of Workers' day celebrations.

The Strike War  
The pamphlet was a series of anti-imperialist and anti-capitalist arguments and was sold for 4 annas at Shwedagon Pagoda on October 8 and 9 to raise money for the Strike Relief Organisation. Hla Gyi describes the poor lot of the majority of the country in both objective and subjective terms and notes the imbalance of wealth distribution.

It has since become "a classic of Burmese socialist writing."

Hla Gyi condemned monopoly capitalists in the fields of oil, mining and timber, as well as landlord and banking. He notes that timber extraction has led to outbreaks of malaria. He advanced a Marxist critique of the Burmah Oil company's exploitation of workers through surplus value exploitation

Hla Gyi also used Burmese historical legends to draw similes to the contemporary era.

Notes

References

Bibliography
 
 
 
 

1900s births
1943 deaths
Burmese activists
Deaths from stomach cancer
Deaths from cancer in Myanmar